No-No's (Leftovers and Live Songs) is the second official CD release by the antifolk group Elastic No-No Band.  It is a compilation of songs that were never intended for a specific album and includes many live performances.

The CD version includes 3 unlisted tracks that are not available when the album is purchased as a download (as from a retailer like iTunes, for example).

Track listing
(Including bracketed notes that appear on the CD)
 "Sally's Strut"
 "Would You Care?"
 "Nobody's Wife (You're The One)" [a real nice live version featuring Sammy Shuster]
 "What I'm Good For"
 "Let's Fuck" [live version where Justin tells the story about the Christian guy]
 "Nobody's Listening"
 "You Never Swam" [a fun live version]
 "Cheese Fries" [like track 7, a real fun live version]
 "Lone Gay Man's Last Words"
 "Younger Than Me"
 "I Am Klaus Kinski" [Justin's solo live version, where gets down off the stage and screams half the song at some drunks who won't stop talking]
 "New York City Girls/You Think It's Wrong (To Sing Along)" [live medley of 2 very fine songs]
 (unlisted)
 (unlisted)
 (unlisted)

Most songs written by Justin Remer.  "Lone Gay Man's Last Words" by Kiel Walker & Justin Remer, based on dialogue from the Troma film, Poultrygeist: Night of the Chicken Dead.  "New York City Girls" by Frank Hoier; this version's additional lyrics by Justin Remer.

Personnel

Elastic No-No Band
Justin Remer - vocals, Guitar, Programming (tracks 1 & 6), Banjo (track 2)
Herb Scher - Piano
Preston Spurlock - Bass
Doug Johnson - percussion, drums

Guests
James Cooper - Guitar (track 2)
Sammy Shuster - vocals (track 3)

Elastic No-No Band albums
B-side compilation albums
2007 compilation albums